Michele Dee Klevens Ritterman Ph.D. (born November 18, 1946) is an American clinical psychologist and family therapist who published Using Hypnosis in Family Therapy, the first book on the systematic integration of family therapy and hypnotherapy.  After receiving her doctorate in Clinical Psychology from Temple University, Ritterman is noted for her expertise regarding survivors of political torture and their families.  She is a prolific author whose work has been translated into Spanish, German, Italian and French.

One of Milton Erickson's foremost students, Ritterman originated the concept of the symptom  as a trance state that is actually suggested by various people and social structures.  From this basic concept that Erickson himself admired, she framed therapy as the production of counter-inductions and hypnotic sequences that impact the symptom trance.

In recent years Ritterman has lectured nationally and internationally on using hypnosis in conjunction with family therapy and more particularly against socially violent governments and their abusive use of psychological methods and techniques.  She also lectures on the survival techniques of families experiencing torture.

Michele Ritterman lives in Berkeley, California and currently has a private practice as an individual, couples and family therapist.  She also consults with agencies and teaches classes at universities, holds workshops, and lectures about her clinical methods.

Family therapy and hypnosis

Ritterman has trained psychotherapists worldwide in her approach to working with couples and families.  In family and couple interactions Ritterman believes there are shared and separate-track trances that can be treated through the development of therapeutic counter-inductions. She employs naturally occurring altered states of consciousness as part of a systematic hypnotherapeutic process. Her approach is based on observable actions and interactions on the part of her client(s).

Ritterman also originated the concept of the symptom as a gift and therapy as a mutually dignifying process of cooperative exchanges between therapist and client, in other words, a form of prestation.  She calls this methodology a woman's spin on therapy, based on a non-hierarchical approach to every step of a systematic therapeutic sequence.  Her latest book The Tao of a Woman  demonstrates how to move from the symptom trance to a healing stance.

Ritterman is a proponent of a humanist perspective in psychotherapy, where instead of the traditional analysis of patients as damaged, the individual is seen as a positive, unique and evolving person, a one-of-a-kind.  Her book in progress From Trance to Stance advocates that the primary goal of psychology is to help create a human-friendly society that caters to the bio-rhythms and natural needs of the human organism.

Political activism

As a political activist Ritterman has served as a spokesperson for Amnesty International and other human rights organizations on the resilience and resourcefulness of families that endure and survive under terror.  She has published numerous papers on the subject and founded or co-founded three organizations giving medical and social aid to people in developing countries who would not otherwise receive it because of their political status.

Her book Hope Under Siege: Terror and Family Support in Chile  with a foreword by Isabel Allende, considers the applications of psychotherapeutic principles in the larger context of political and social reality.  In Ritterman's words “Reciprocity is the highest form of love. And love has everything to do with healing.” (The Tao of a Woman)

In the forward to Hope Under Siege Isabel Allende writes:

"Michele Ritterman has immersed herself in a complex and frightening reality, to discover its secrets and capture its deepest essence. Through the families of political prisoners, she tells us of an abused continent, of a time of horror, and of the incredible extent of human evil. But this book is not a retelling of death and pain. It is above all a testimony of hope. In this book, Michele Ritterman gives us a formidable lesson in life."

Books 

Using Hypnosis in Family Therapy (Jossey-Bass Publishers 1983)
L’ipnsi Nella Terapia della Famiglia (Casa Editrice Astrolabio 1986)
El Empleo de Hypnosis en Terapia Familiar (Amorrortu Editors 1983)
Woman's Wisdom (Skipping Stones Editions 2007)
The Tao of a Woman (Skipping Stones Editions 2009)
El Tao de Una Mujer (Skipping Stones Editions 2008)
Hope Under Siege: Terror and Family Support in Chile  (Ablex Publishing 1991)
Liebe und Terror in Chile (Verlag Modernes Lernen 1990)

Audiotape 
Shared Couples Trances for the Hypnosis Network 2005

Publications 
The Philosophical Position of the Ericksonian Psychotherapist, Zeig-Tucker Publishers 2000
The Centennial Year of Milton Erickson and Family Therapy, The California Therapist, July–August, pp. 51–54 2001
The Philosophical Position of the Ericksonian Psychotherapist, Zeig-Tucker Publishers
Stopping the Clock, The Family Therapy Networker, pp. 45–51, paper on clock vs. subjective time in psychotherapy 1995
A Five-Part Poetic Induction in Favor of Human Decency (Countering the Hate Movements), Michele Klevens Ritterman, accepted for publication by Brunner/Mazel Publishers, Editor, Jeffrey K. Zeig 1993
Notes of a Psychology Watcher: Words that Harm, Words that Heal, Erickson Newsletter, Vol. 12, No. 3, Autumn, Phoenix, Arizona 1992
Hope Under Siege: Terror and Family Support in Chile, Frontiers of Psychotherapy Series, Ablex Publishing, Norwood, New Jersey 1990
Understanding and Treating Latin American Torture Survivors, with Rich Simon, in The Social and Political Contexts of Family Therapy, Marsha Mirkin, Allyn and Bacon, pp. 277–288 1990
Liebe Und Terror: in Chile, Verlag Modernes Lernen, Dortmund, Germany 1988
Empleo de Hipnosis en Terapia Familiar, Book Translated into Spanish, Amorrotu Editores, Buenos Aires, Argentina 1988
Inhumanity and The Human Family, Australian and New Zealand Journal of Family Therapy, Vol. 7, No. 1, Editor's Guest Article 1987
Symptome: Zwschen Sozialer, Repression und Innerer Freiheit, Familien Dynamik, Klett-Cotta, Stuttgart, Germany, Heft 1, January, pp. 15–39 1987
Exploring Relationships between Ericksonian Hypnotherapy and Family Therapy, Indirect Approaches in Therapy, Steve de Shazer, Editor, Aspen Publishers, Rockville, Maryland 1986
The Bridge is Love, Report from Human Rights Taskforce of American Family Therapy Association (AFTA). AFTA Newsletter, #26, Winter, pp. 24–28 1986
Torture: The Counter-Therapy of the State, The Family Therapy Networker, January–February 1987, pp. 43–47 1986
Agresion, Published in Spanish in Terapia Psicologica, Año V, No. 8, Santiago, Chile, pp. 54–60 1986

References

External links 
www.micheleritterman.com
The Milton H. Erickson Foundation
Ericksonian.Info
Amnesty International

21st-century American psychologists
American women psychologists
1946 births
Living people
21st-century American women
20th-century American psychologists